The Cook Islands Boy Scout Association comes under the administration of Scouting New Zealand, continuing the arrangement from before the Cook Islands became a self-governing dependency of New Zealand.

See also

 The Girl Guides Cook Islands Association

External links
general information

Overseas branches of Scouting and Guiding associations
Scouting and Guiding in the Cook Islands